Yabucoa Boriken is a Puerto Rican soccer team that plays in Yabucoa.  They play in the 2nd Division of the Puerto Rico Soccer League.  They also play in the Liga Nacional.

2008 season
The team finished the season with a record of 4-5.

Liga Nacional
Lost their first game 2-1 to Maunabo Leones.

Current squad

References

Puerto Rico Soccer League 2nd Division
Liga Nacional de Fútbol de Puerto Rico teams